The Ignacy Jan Paderewski Polish Institute of Diplomacy (PID) is a Polish government funded institution reporting to the Minister of Foreign Affairs. The primary goal of the institute is to educate and develop the professional skills of Polish Foreign Service officers. The institute offers a range of courses primarily for MFA employees.

History
The Ignacy Jan Paderewski Polish Institute of Diplomacy was established on October 1, 2012, by directive of the Minister of Foreign Affairs, Radosław Sikorski. the directive was issued on September 20, 2012. Katarzyna Skórzyńska was appointed as the first director of the institute. The current patron of the institute is Ignacy Jan Paderewski, a statesman, eminent activist for independence, Polish Prime Minister, Minister of Foreign Affairs and an outstanding pianist and composer.

Training Courses
Training courses delivered by the PID are primarily geared towards employees of the Ministry of Foreign Affairs and ultimately, to civil servants working in other institutions of public administration and local government. The courses help to train professional diplomats as well as expand knowledge of bilateral relations, the activities of international organizations such as the European Union and economy and law.

Diplomatic and Consular Training
At the request of the Director General of the Foreign Service, the PID began delivering diplomatic and consular training for diplomatic corps candidates in January 2013.

References

External links
 PID website (English)
 Act of 27 July 2001 on the Foreign Service  (Polish)
 Regulation of Minister of Foreign Affairs of 19 July 2002 on organisation of the diplomatic and consular training (Polish)

Diplomacy